Jane Summersett (born December 24, 1987) is an American former competitive ice dancer. She teamed up with Todd Gilles in April 2007. The two won the bronze medal at the 2008 Nebelhorn Trophy and placed seventh at the 2010 Four Continents Championships.

Earlier in her career, Summersett competed with Elliot Pennington. They won junior bronze medals at the 2005 ISU Junior Grand Prix in Poland and 2006 U.S. Championships.

Summersett attends the University of Detroit Mercy School of Dentistry.

Programs

With Gilles

With Pennington

Competitive highlights

With Gilles

With Pennington

References

External links

 
 
 

American female ice dancers
People from Marquette, Michigan
Living people
1987 births
21st-century American women